David Campbell (18 February 1947 – 7 December 2013) was a Welsh professional footballer who played as a winger. He made appearances in the English Football League for Wrexham.

References

1947 births
2013 deaths
Welsh footballers
Association football wingers
Wrexham A.F.C. players
Corby Town F.C. players
English Football League players